Janette Bouman (born 17 June 1964 in Veendam, Netherlands) is a Dutch-born Kazakhstani dressage rider.  She represented Kazakhstan at the 2014 World Equestrian Games in Normandy where she finished 52nd in the individual dressage with her horse . 

She also competed for Kazakhstan at the 2014 Asian Games where she finished 9th individually and 8th with the Kazakh team in team dressage competition.

References

Living people
1964 births
Kazakhstani female equestrians
Equestrians at the 2014 Asian Games
Asian Games competitors for Kazakhstan
Kazakhstani dressage riders
Kazakhstani people of Dutch descent